Rubeš is the surname of:

 Jan Rubeš (1920–2009), Czech-Canadian bass opera singer and actor
 Susan Douglas Rubeš or Rubeš (1925–2013), Austrian-Canadian actress and producer
 Tomáš Rubeš (born 1992), Czech hockey player
 Vladimir Rubeš or Rubeš (born 1970), Australian hockey player and coach